Kenitra Athletic Club (KAC) is a Moroccan football and basketball club based in the city of Kenitra.

History

The club, which was founded in 1938, is one of the most famous and popular football clubs in Morocco. The second oldest club among Moroccan clubs founded by Moroccans only, The Club also has the fifth best record in winning the Moroccan Football league, 4 times: (1960, 1973, 1981 and 1982) behind Wydad Athletic Club, FAR de Rabat, Raja Club Athletic and Maghreb de Fès. Without forgetting the record scorer in the moroccan football league held by the Top Scorer Mohamed Bousati with 25 goals scored during the season 1981/1982. However, they never reclaimed their success of the 80s. In recent times they have flipped between the Botola and Botola 2, never finding consistency in the top division.

Honours

Moroccan Championship
1960, 1973, 1981, 1982
Runner-up : 1979, 1985

Moroccan League Second Division
1976, 2002
Runner-up : 2007

Coupe du Trône
1961
Runner-up : 1969, 1976, 1991

Current squad

Sport equipment
 Sarson Sports

Managers

  Mounir Jaouani
  A. Kedmirri
  A. Loukhmirri
  Ahmed Souiri
  F. Vegas
  M. El Ammari
  Boujemaâ Benkhrif
  O. Ladislav
  A. Zalai
  B. El Ghalemi
  Mircea Dridea
  A. Greco
  P. Mendez
  Y. Kadda
  Mohamed Boussati
  M. Bouâbid
  M. Rhiad
  M. Belhassan
  Robert Muller
  Virgil Popescu
  Nedjm Eddine Belayachi
  Zoran Vujović (2007–08)
  J. Chadli
  M. Baltham
  Rachid Taoussi
  F. Sahabi
  Jamal Jebrane
  Oscar Fulloné (2009–10)
  Abdelkhalek Louzani
  Abdelaziz Kerkach
  Youssef Lamrini
  Abdelkader Youmir (Nov 14, 2012 – Jan 1, 2013)
  Zoran Vujović (Jan 3, 2013 – April 29, 2013)
  Abdelkhalek Louzani

Presidents (since 1938)

 Seddik M'kinsi
 Abdelkader Sbai (Tanto)
 Ahmed Souiri
 Abderahmmane M'kinsi
 Mohammed Temsamani
 Moulay Ahmed Ouadghiri
 Mohammed Benjelloun
 Ahmed Benkirane
 Mohammed Bouaazaoui
 Haitouf Elghazi
 Mohammed Doumou (1975–00)
 Mohammed El Harrati
 Mohammed Al Moutawakkil
 Houcine Benmoussa
 Khalil Sebbar
 Benaissa Akrouch
 Hakim Doumou (2006–11)
 Mohammed Chibar (2011–)
 Badr Hari (2014–)

Kit

References

External links
  Official Website
  Popular KAC Kenitra Website
  Wikipedia France

Football clubs in Morocco
Sport in Kenitra
1938 establishments in Morocco
Sports clubs in Morocco
Association football clubs established in 1938